Lorenz Kienzle (born November 15, 1967]) is a German photographer. He has been living in Berlin since 1991.

Life 
Kienzle spent his childhood and youth in the Bavarian capital Munich. In an interview with the magazine Berliner Woche in the context of the exhibition Mein erstes gutes Foto (My first good photo) at Berlin Brotfabrik gallery in 2015 he talked about the first photo he magnified by himself while still at school in the 1980s: "In art lessons at my school, I had only spent a single hour in the darkroom. I still remember how the teacher rushed me to quickly move the photo paper from bath to bath".

After a one-year stay in Rome (1990–1991) at the Istituto Superiore di Fotografia, he trained as a photographer at the Berufsfachschule für Fotografie at Lette-Verein in Berlin (1991–1993). After graduating in 1993, he started to work as a freelance photographer, focusing on industrial heritage, architecture, urban space and portraiture. Photographic works by him were published during this time in the German daily newspapers Die Tageszeitung and Die Zeit. He works with a large format camera and B/W film.

Work 
In 1999 Kienzle started to work in the field of documentary photography for museums and other cultural institutions. Since 2006 he has been photographing large sculptures of the American artist Richard Serra in public spaces worldwide. In 2008, he was commissioned by Serra to photograph the exhibition Promenade at the Grand Palais in Paris for Monumenta 2008 as well as the installation piece Promenade for the exhibition catalogue and other advertising media such as posters and press photos.

In his artistic work since 2002, one focus have been the works by German novelist and poet Theodor Fontane. In the Tatort Fontane series he dealt with Fontane's novels, for which Kienzle took photographs at original locations from a contemporary perspective. The series was supplemented in 2019 with current works on a total of 11 novels, and shown in the exhibition Fontanes Berlin at Märkisches Museum. Through an exhibition project with archived photographs by Heinz Krüger, who was well known in the GDR, his focus since 2017 has also been on Fontane's Wanderungen durch die Mark Brandenburg. The results of numerous photographic excursions into the Berlin area on bicycle have been included in the book Brandenburger Notizen : Fontane - Krüger - Kienzle, published in March 2019, and an exhibition in the Museum Falkensee as part of Fontane.200, a program series funded by the annual culture festival ″Kulturland Brandenburg″. Further literary research deals with the work of Alfred Döblin. Here, too, Kienzle seeks out original locations for the novels, especially in Berlin. The first results of this research can be found in the publication of the Swedish festival O/Modernt The Art of Borrowing: Or How One Thing Leads to Another (2016).

Photographs by Lorenz Kienzle can be found in the Guggenheim Museum Bilbao, the German Museum of Technology in Berlin, the Brandenburg Museum of Industry, and in numerous private collections. In 2016 the Stadtmuseum Berlin purchased his picture series Tatort Fontane. It was shown as part of the culture festival Fontane.200 in September 2019, together with original manuscripts of Fontane novels and views of Berlin from Fontane's time in the exhibition Fontanes Berlin – Photographs & Writings. Fiction & Reality.

The Syrian filmmaker Omar Akahare followed Kienzle with a video camera during his work on the portrait series Ein Jahr Heimat (One Year Home). The short documentary portrait about Lorenz Kienzle had its premiere at the opening of the exhibition One Year Home at Käthe Kollwitz Museum (Berlin) on February 26, 2017.

Since 2017, Kienzle reviewed and digitized the photo archive of Müllrose photographer Ursula Raschke, resulting in an online exhibition project in 2020 and in the urban space of Müllrose on his initiative.

As part of Kulturland Brandenburg's theme year in 2021: Future of the Past – Industrial Culture on the Move, Kienzle showed a first time retrospective of his work on industrial culture, spanning a work period of three decades, at the Senftenberg Fortress and Museumsfabrik Pritzwalk titled Brandenburg Industrial Landscapes 1992–2021.

Awards 
 2004 Muse Medallion of the American Cat Writers' Association for the book ABC Cat in the Category "Best Black and White Photo Series", Houston

Grants 
 1996 Eddie Adams Grant for the Barnstorm IX Workshop, New York City
 1997 Scholarship of the BildForum Herten for the Workshop for Photojournalism, Herten
 2005 VG Bild-Kunst Award for the picture series Neukölln, Bonn
 2012 Promotional Prize of VG Bild-Kunst for the photo project Döblins Berlin, Bonn
 2016 Purchase of the picture series Tatort Fontane with means of the Berlin Lotto Foundation by the Artists' Fund of the Berlin Senate

Exhibitions (selection) 
 Monti Sabini, Photofusion Gallery London, 1995
 Im Lausitzer Braunkohlerevier, International Photo Days Herten, 1997
 Monti Sabini, Exposure – Hereford Photography Festival, England 1999
 Hutmacher, Städtisches Museum Sprucker Mühle Guben, 2000
 Terra da Mare, Centro Civico di Cornigliano, Genoa 2001
 The Hat Factory, Exposure – Hereford Photography Festival, England 2001
 Kommen, Bleiben, Gehen (Coming, Staying, Going), German-Polish Culture Festival Le Week End 3, Guben/Gubin, 2001
 Les chapeliers de Guben, Musée du chapeau, Chazelles-sur-Lyon 2002
 Terra da Mare, Photogalerie 94, Ennetbaden, Schweiz 2004
 Guben/Gubin, Exposure – Hereford Photography Festival, England 2004
 Museum/Porträt, Ministry of Science, Research and Culture, Potsdam 2005
 Hutmacher, Westfälisches Industriemuseum, Textilmuseum Bocholt, 2007; 2010–2012
 Gefängnis Luckau (Luckau Prison), Niederlausitzmuseum Luckau, 2009
 Tatort Fontane, Museum Neuruppin, 2010
 Neukölln, Galerie im Körnerpark, Berlin 2011
 Tatort Fontane, Museum und Galerie Falkensee, 2012
 Hutmacher, LVR-Industriemuseum Textilfabrik Cromford, 2014/2015
 Rüstung auf dem Prüfstand. Kummersdorf, Peenemünde und die totale Mobilmachung, Historisch-Technisches Museum Peenemünde, 2014/2015
 Horno, as part of the exhibition "Alltag Einheit", Deutsches Historisches Museum Berlin, 2015/2016
 Gesichter des Käthe-Kollwitz-Museums, zus. m. Ronka Oberhammer, Käthe Kollwitz Museum (Berlin), 2016
 Ein Jahr Heimat, Käthe-Kollwitz-Museum Berlin, 2017
 Contributions to Krieg oder Raumfahrt? Peenemünde in der öffentlichen Erinnerung seit 1945. Exhibition at Historisch-Technisches Museum Peenemünde 2019/2020
 Brandenburger Notizen: Fontane – Krüger – Kienzle. Exhibition Museum und Galerie Falkensee; Kurt Tucholsky Literaturmuseum Schloss Rheinsberg, Remise; Universitätsbibliothek Göttingen 2019
 Fontanes Berlin – Fotografien & Schriften. Fiktion & Wirklichkeit. Märkisches Museum Berlin, 2019
 Lorenz Kienzle Werkschau. Fotografien von 1994–2018. Galerie Argus Fotokunst Berlin, 2020.
 Gutspark Karwe. In: Wildnis, Gelände, Natur. With Ursula Böhmer, Ingar Krauss, Werner Mahler, Galerie Amalienpark – Raum für Kunst Berlin, 2021.
 Brandenburger Industrielandschaften 1992–2021. Kunstsammlung Lausitz at Festung Senftenberg and Museumsfabrik Pritzwalk, 2021.

Publications 
 "Brandenburger Notizen. Fontane – Krüger – Kienzle", Verlag für Berlin-Brandenburg, Berlin 2019. . 
 Contributions to "Krieg oder Raumfahrt?: Peenemünde in der öffentlichen Erinnerung seit 1945", Christoph Links Verlag, Berlin 2019. . 
 "It's still there: Döblin's Alexanderplatz", in: Williamson, Paul (ed.): The Art of Borrowing: Or How One Thing Leads to Another. Festival Publication of O/Modernt, Cambridge/Stockholm 2016. .
 Alfred Pacquement: "Richard Serra". Steidl Verlag, Göttingen 2015. .
 Aumann, Philipp: "Rüstung auf dem Prüfstand. Kummersdorf, Peenemünde und die totale Mobilmachung". Ch. Links Verlag, Berlin 2015. . .
 "Sein Glück verdienen – Theodor Fontanes zeitlose Heldinnen", with Burkhard Spinnen, Knesebeck Verlag, Munich 2012. . .
 "Die Befreiungshalle Kelheim: Geschichte – Mythos – Gegenwart". Regensburger Studien zur Kunstgeschichte, Ed. Christoph Wagner. Verlag Schnell & Steiner, Regensburg 2012. . .
 "Constantin Brancusi and Richard Serra". Fondation Beyeler/Guggenheim Bilbao, Hatje Cantz Verlag, Berlin/Stuttgart 2009, 2. Aufl. 2011. .
 "Museen in Brandenburg". Museum Guide, Ed. Museumsverband Brandenburg e. V. 2008. .
 "Monumenta 2008. Richard Serra, Promenade". Exhibition Catalogue, Eds. Centre National des Artes Plastiques / Editions du Centre Pompidou, Paris 2008. .
 "Luckau – Tor zur Niederlausitz. Mensch, Kultur, Natur". Exhibition Catalogue, Niederlausitz-Museum Luckau, 2008. .
 "Richard Serra, Recent Works". Exhibition Catalogue, Gagosian Gallery, London 2007.
 "Richard Serra, Sculpture: Forty Years". Exhibition Catalogue, Museum of Modern Art, New York 2006. .
 "Schwarze Pumpe". Ed. Vattenfall Europe Mining & Generation. INIK (Institut für Neue Industriekultur), Forst 2005. . .
 "ABC Cat". Stewart, Tabori & Chang, New York 2004. .
 "Katten ABC". BZZTôH Publishers, Den Haag 2006. . .
 "Das Katzen ABC". Knesebeck Verlag, Munich 2005. . .
 "Le cas du chat". Edition Manise, Paris 2005. . .
 "Hutmacher. Bilder vom letzten Kapitel der Gubener Hutindustrie. Photographien von Lorenz Kienzle". Ausstellungskatalog, Städtisches Museum "Sprucker Mühle" Guben, 2000. .

References

External links 
 Website Lorenz Kienzle
 ″Die Love-Parade im Tiergarten″, 3 picture contributions by Lorenz Kienzle to the photography fair ″Fotobild Berlin″, Berlin 2001 
 Photo gallery by Lorenz Kienzle in ″Momentaufnahmen aus der ′Weißen Residenz′ Gropiusstadt″, in: Bauwelt No. 7/2013 
 Portrait on Lorenz Kienzle by Maurice Wojach: ″Brandenburg-Streifzüge mit einer alten Plattenkamera″. In: maz-online.de June 27, 2019, p. 10. 

1967 births
20th-century German photographers
21st-century German photographers
Living people
Photographers from Berlin